Summit Lawn is a small unincorporated village in Lehigh County, Pennsylvania. Summit Lawn is part of the Lehigh Valley, which has a population of 861,899 and is the 68th most populous metropolitan area in the U.S. as of the 2020 census. 

Parts of Summit Lawn are in Upper Saucon Township while others are in Salisbury Township. The Salisbury Township government offices are located in Summit Lawn.

Pennsylvania Route 145 runs through Summit Lawn. The village sits on South Mountain, near Interstate 78 and Pennsylvania Route 309. It uses the Allentown ZIP code of 18103. WFMZ-TV, a Lehigh Valley television station, is located in Summit Lawn.

References

Unincorporated communities in Lehigh County, Pennsylvania
Unincorporated communities in Pennsylvania